Ball splines (Ball Spline bearings) are a special type of linear motion bearing that are used to provide nearly frictionless linear motion while allowing the member to transmit torque simultaneously. There are grooves ground along the length of the shaft (thus forming splines) for the ball bearings to run inside. The outer shell that houses the balls is called a nut rather than a bushing, but is not a nut in the traditional sense—it is not free to rotate about the shaft, but is free to travel up and down the shaft. For a shaft travel of any significant length the nut will have channels that recirculate the balls, operating in the same way as a ball screw. 

By increasing the contact area of the ball bearings on the shaft to approximately 45 degrees, the side load and direct load carrying capabilities are greatly increased. Each nut can be individually preloaded at the factory to decrease the available radial play to ensure rigidity. This process not only increases the contact area, increasing direct loading capabilities, but it also restricts any radial movement, increasing the overhung moment capabilities.  This creates a sturdier structure that can handle a very strenuous working environment.

See also

References

Bearings (mechanical)